Silent Night is a 2002 television film set on Christmas Eve in 1944, during the Battle of the Bulge of World War II and is loosely based on true events.

Plot
A German mother, Elisabeth Vincken (Linda Hamilton), who had already lost her eldest son in the Battle of Stalingrad and whose husband is a cook serving in the German Army, and her younger son, Fritz, are seeking refuge in their family's hunting cabin near the front lines in the Ardennes forests region of western Europe.  They encounter three American soldiers who enter the cabin, and then soon after three German soldiers join them. After much resistance the mother manages to convince the enemy soldiers to put aside their differences for one night and share a Christmas dinner. The Germans were planning to kill the Americans, but eventually they and the American soldiers share their rations to make a proper Christmas dinner. This includes homemade cookies and other goodies.

Throughout the night the Americans and Germans befriend each other, despite the fact that they will eventually have to return to the war. The next morning an American MP comes and is surprised by what he sees. As he learns of what has happened he turns his rifle on the American soldiers and begins talking with the Germans. Realizing the officer is really a German soldier who has infiltrated the American lines, the Americans surrender and the three German soldiers get their weapons. The German infiltrator then orders the three other soldiers to execute the Americans. Just before he is about to shoot the mother, one of the German soldiers knocks him out, saving her. The soldiers depart, with the Americans taking the German infiltrator as a prisoner of war, and also one of the Germans, who is only fifteen - neither side wants him to die in a future battle. The Germans also return to their side. All say goodbye and wish each other good luck for the rest of the war. In the present day, an elder Fritz (Michael Sinelnikoff) is visited by Private Jimmy Rassi's grandson, Christopher, with Fritz handing over Rassi's dogtags which were used to adorn the top of the cabin's Christmas tree.

Cast
Linda Hamilton as Elisabeth Vincken
Matthew Harbour as Fritz Vincken
Romano Orzari as Pvt. Jimmy Rassi
Alain Goulem as Sgt. Ralph Blank
Michael Elkin as Pvt. Herbie Ridgin
Martin Neufeld as Lt. Hans Klosterman
Mark Antony Krupa as Sgt. Marcus Mueller
James McGowan as Capt. Dietrich
Cassian Bopp as Pvt. Peter Heinrich

Award nominations
Silent Night was nominated for four Gemini Awards at the 18th Gemini Awards held in 2003:
 Best Direction in a Dramatic Program or Mini-Series: Rodney Gibbons
 Best Original Music Score for a Program or Mini-Series: James Gelfand
 Best Photography in a Dramatic Program or Series: Eric Cayla
 Best Sound in a Dramatic Program: Scott Donald, Richard Betanzos, Véronique Gabillaud, David Gertsman, Michael Gurman, Paul Hubert

See also
 List of Christmas films

Notes
 The story was profiled on Unsolved Mysteries, in which Fritz Vincken was seeking the information on the soldiers. The episode resulted in Vincken being reunited with Ralph Blank in 1995.

References

External links
 
 Interview with Fritz Vincken
 Obituary of Fritz Vincken

2000s German-language films
2002 television films
2002 films
Canadian drama television films
Canadian war drama films
Christmas television films
2002 drama films
Canadian Christmas films
English-language Canadian films
Films set in Germany
Western Front of World War II films
Christmas war films
World War II films based on actual events
2000s Christmas films
Films directed by Rodney Gibbons
2000s English-language films
Canadian World War II films
2000s Canadian films
World War II television films